Aglietta is an Italian surname. Notable people with the surname include:

 Michel Aglietta (born 1938), French economist
 Adelaide Aglietta (1940–2000), Italian politician

Italian-language surnames